National Route 418 is a national highway of Japan connecting Ōno, Fukui and Iida, Nagano in Japan, with a total length of .

See also

References

418
Roads in Fukui Prefecture
Roads in Gifu Prefecture
Roads in Nagano Prefecture